Good Acoustics is the fourth studio album by the hard rock band FireHouse. It was released in 1996 on Epic Records. The album featured acoustic versions of several of the band's biggest hits. However, it also featured four new songs (one of them being an Eagles cover song [Actually, a cover of the Eagles' cover of Steve Young's Seven Bridges Road.]).

The album was a commercial flop in the United States compared to the first three albums, making it the first Firehouse album not to enter the Billboard charts. However, it did chart in Thailand, Malaysia and the Philippines, where the album was certified gold thanks to hit songs "You Are My Religion", "Love Don't Care" and "In Your Perfect World". A music video for "Love of a Lifetime" was shot entirely in Chao Praya River in Bangkok, Thailand.

It spawned a tour in Asia and the United States (playing at the smaller venues) to support the album.

It was the band's final album with the major label.

Track listing
All songs written by Bill Leverty and C.J. Snare, except where noted.

 "You Are My Religion" - 4:03
 "Love Don't Care" - 4:42
 "In Your Perfect World" - 4:08
 "No One at All" - 3:34
 "Love of a Lifetime" - 4:42
 "All She Wrote" - 3:46
 "When I Look Into Your Eyes" - 4:04
 "Don't Treat Me Bad" (Ellis, Foster, Leverty, Snare) - 4:18
 "Here for You" - 3:53
 "I Live My Life for You" - 4:22
 "Seven Bridges Road" (Steve Young) - 2:39

Certification

Personnel
C.J. Snare - vocals, keyboards
Bill Leverty - guitars
Michael Foster - drums
Perry Richardson - bass

References

FireHouse (band) albums
1996 compilation albums
Epic Records compilation albums